Yardley station is a SEPTA Regional Rail station in Yardley, Pennsylvania. It is located at Main Street and Reading Avenue and serves the West Trenton Line to New Jersey. The station has off-street parking.  In FY 2017, Yardley station had a weekday average of 349 boardings and 328 alightings. By August 2015, as a result of the SEPTA and CSX separation between Woodbourne and West Trenton stations, the outbound platform was removed, and all SEPTA traffic was diverted onto the Inbound track. Currently, all SEPTA service between Yardley and West Trenton operates on the Inbound track only.

History
The station was originally built to be part of the Bound Brook branch of the Philadelphia & Reading Railroad (P&R). In 1874, it was announced that the P&R would build a line from Jenkintown station to the Delaware River where it would have a bridge to connect it to the Delaware and Bound Railroad.

Station layout
Yardley consists of a single high-level side platform.

Bibliography

References

External links

SEPTA - Yardley Station
Former Yardley P&R Station
Flickr images by "Roadgeek Adam"

SEPTA Regional Rail stations
Former Reading Company stations
Railway stations in Bucks County, Pennsylvania
Railway stations opened in 1876
1876 establishments in Pennsylvania